S. Gill may refer to:

 S. Gill (Berkshire cricketer)
 S. Gill, President of the British Computer Society

See also
Gill (name)#People with the surname Gill